Leucanopsis sthenia is a moth of the family Erebidae. It was described by George Hampson in 1901. It is found in Bolivia, Peru and Venezuela.

References

 

sthenia
Moths described in 1901